The 2019 NASCAR Whelen Modified Tour was the thirty-fifth season of the Whelen Modified Tour (WMT), a stock car racing tour sanctioned by NASCAR. It began with the Performance Plus 150 presented by Safety-Kleen at Myrtle Beach Speedway on March 16 and concluded with the Sunoco World Series 150 at Thompson Speedway Motorsports Park on October 13. Justin Bonsignore entered the season as the defending drivers' champion. 2019 marked the third season of the unification of the Whelen (Northern) Modified Tour and the Whelen Southern Modified Tour. Doug Coby won the championship, his sixth, eight points ahead of Bonsignore.

Drivers

Notes

Schedule
On November 21, 2018, NASCAR announced the 2019 schedule. Langley and Bristol were dropped from the schedule in favor of South Boston and Wall Stadium. The All-Star Shootout, held at New Hampshire, did not count towards the championship. Twelve of the seventeen races in the season were televised on NBCSN on a tape delay basis. All races in the season were shown live on FansChoice.tv.

Notes

Results and standings

Races

Notes
1 – There was no qualifying session for the All-Star Shootout. The starting grid was decided with a random draw.

Drivers' championship
(key) Bold – Pole position awarded by time. Italics – Pole position set by final practice results or Owners' points. * – Most laps led.

Notes
‡ – Non-championship round.
1 – John Baker, Amy Catalano, Kyle Ellwood, Melissa Fifield, Andrew Molleur, Walter Sutcliffe Jr. and Roger Turbush received championship points, despite the fact that they did not qualify for the race.
2 – J. R. Bertuccio received championship points, despite the fact that he did not start the race.
3 – Ronnie Williams qualified in the No. 07 for Patrick Emerling.
4 – Max Zachem qualified in the No. 26 for Gary McDonald.

See also
2019 Monster Energy NASCAR Cup Series
2019 NASCAR Xfinity Series
2019 NASCAR Gander Outdoors Truck Series
2019 ARCA Menards Series
2019 NASCAR K&N Pro Series East
2019 NASCAR K&N Pro Series West
2019 NASCAR Pinty's Series
2019 NASCAR PEAK Mexico Series
2019 NASCAR Whelen Euro Series

References

External links

NASCAR Whelen Modified Tour